The 1926 Saxony state election was held on 31 October 1926 to elect the 96 members of the Landtag of Saxony.

Results

References 

Saxony
Elections in Saxony